First War of Independence may refer to:

India's First War of Independence
First Italian War of Independence
First War of Scottish Independence

See also
War of Independence (disambiguation)
Second War of Independence (disambiguation)
First Battle of Independence